The 2009 NASCAR Camping World West Series was the 56th season of Camping World West Series, a regional stock car racing series sanctioned by NASCAR. It began with the Allstate Texas Thunder 150 at Thunderhill Raceway on March 14, 2009, and concluded with the Toyota/Copart 150 at All-American Speedway on September 26, 2009. Jason Bowles won the championship, 123 points in front of Eric Holmes.

This was the last season for the West Series with the Camping World title sponsorship. Because Camping World decided to be the title sponsor for the NASCAR Truck Series starting in 2009, they did not renew their title sponsorship of NASCAR's East and West Series after their contract for that ended at the end of the 2009 season. (So, they sponsored all three series for that year only.) K&N Filters became the new title sponsor for the East and West Series starting in 2010.

Schedule and results

See also
 2009 NASCAR Sprint Cup Series
 2009 NASCAR Nationwide Series
 2009 NASCAR Camping World Truck Series
 2009 ARCA Re/Max Series
 2009 NASCAR Camping World East Series
 2009 NASCAR Canadian Tire Series
 2009 NASCAR Corona Series
 2009 NASCAR Mini Stock Series

External links
 2009 NASCAR Camping World West Series Results

ARCA Menards Series West